Jasna Fritzi Bauer (born 20 February 1989) is a Swiss actress. She has appeared in more than fifteen films since 2010.

Selected filmography

References

External links 

1989 births
Living people
Swiss film actresses